Dancin' Days is a Brazilian telenovela produced and broadcast by TV Globo. It premiered on 10 July 1978 and ended on 26 January 1979, with a total of 173 episodes. It's the twenty first "novela das oito" to be aired on the timeslot. It is created and written by Gilberto Braga and directed by Daniel Filho.

Cast

References

External links 
 

TV Globo telenovelas
1978 telenovelas
Brazilian telenovelas
1978 Brazilian television series debuts
1979 Brazilian television series endings
Telenovelas by Gilberto Braga
Portuguese-language telenovelas
Television shows set in Rio de Janeiro (city)
Television series about revenge